Rising to the Bait is a 1992 German comedy film directed by Vadim Glowna. It was entered into the 42nd Berlin International Film Festival.

Cast
 Elsa Grube-Deister as Ada Fenske
 Rolf Zacher as Zwirner
 Muriel Baumeister as Svetlana
 Ben Becker as Funke
 Günter Kornas as Solters
 Franz Viehmann as Fiedler
 Hans Jochen Röhrig as Pastor Seidel
 Roman Silberstein as Hein Geerke
 Werner Schwuchow as Braeske
 Bruno Dunst as Schreker
 Wolf-Dietrich Berg as Naujok
 Heinz-Werner Kraehkamp as Raschke
 Ralf Sählbrandt as Benno

References

External links

1992 films
1992 comedy films
German comedy films
1990s German-language films
Films directed by Vadim Glowna
1990s German films